Zhang Lu (born November 1976) is a Chinese pilot selected as part of the Shenzhou program. He enlisted in the People's Liberation Army (PLA) in August 1999, and joined the Chinese Communist Party (CCP) in April 1999.

Zhang launched on the Shenzhou 15 mission to the Tiangong space station.

Biography 
Zhang was born in Hanshou County, Hunan, in November 1976. He attended Chengguan No. 4 Primary School, Zhanlepin Middle School and Hanshou County No. 1 High School. In 1981, at the age of 5, his family relocated to downtown Hanshou County, where they engaged in freshwater aquaculture. Due to hard work and thrift, his family became a 10,000-Yuan-Household in the early days of the Chinese economic reform. In his early teens, he developed taste for singing.

After graduating from the current PLA Air Force Aviation University in 2000, he became a fighter pilot in the People's Liberation Army Air Force, and was selected to be an astronaut in May 2010.

References 

1976 births
Living people
People from Hanshou County
PLA Air Force Aviation University alumni
Shenzhou program astronauts
People's Liberation Army Astronaut Corps
People's Liberation Army Air Force personnel
Spacewalkers